Ortona was a town in ancient Latium in central Italy.

Livy records that in 481 BC the Aequi laid siege to Ortona.

References
 Livy, Ab urbe condita, 2:43

Ancient Abruzzo
Ortona
5th century BC in Italy